124 may refer to:
124 (number), a natural number
AD 124, a year in the 2nd century AD
124 BC, a year in the 2nd century BC
124 (New Jersey bus)
124 (turbojet)
 "124", a song by Photek from their album Modus Operandi

See also 
 Unbiquadium, a hypothetical chemical element with atomic number 124